Rockhampton North was an electoral district of the Legislative Assembly in the Australian state of Queensland from 1888 to 1912, and from 1960 to 1992.

It was based on the northern area of Rockhampton. In both incarnations, it was replaced by the district of Keppel.

Rockhampton North was generally a safe seat for the Labor Party. It was one of the eleven seats held by Labor in their "cricket team" caucus after the 1974 election, their worst defeat until 2012.

Members for Rockhampton North

Election results

See also
 Electoral districts of Queensland
 Members of the Queensland Legislative Assembly by year
 :Category:Members of the Queensland Legislative Assembly by name

References

Former electoral districts of Queensland